Tyrrell is an unincorporated community in Trumbull County, in the U.S. state of Ohio.

History
The community was named for Elijah and Ebijah Tyrell, pioneer settlers.  A variant name was Tyrell Hill. A post office called Tyrrell Hill was established in 1878, the name was changed to Tyrrell in 1894, and the post office closed in 1930.

References

Unincorporated communities in Trumbull County, Ohio
1878 establishments in Ohio
Populated places established in 1878
Unincorporated communities in Ohio